These are the official results of the Women’s javelin throw event at the 1994 European Championships in Helsinki, Finland, held at Helsinki Olympic Stadium on 11 and 12 August 1994. There were a total number of 22 participating athletes. All results were made with a rough surfaced javelin (old design).

Medalists

Abbreviations
All results shown are in metres

Records

Qualification

Group A

Group B

Final

Participation
According to an unofficial count, 22 athletes from 14 countries participated in the event.

 (1)
 (1)
 (1)
 (1)
 (3)
 (3)
 (3)
 (1)
 (1)
 (1)
 (1)
 (2)
 (1)
 (2)

See also
 1991 Women's World Championships Javelin Throw (Tokyo)
 1992 Women's Olympic Javelin Throw (Barcelona)
 1993 Women's World Championships Javelin Throw (Stuttgart)
 1995 Women's World Championships Javelin Throw (Gothenburg)
 1996 Women's Olympic Javelin Throw (Atlanta)
 1997 Women's World Championships Javelin Throw (Athens)

References

 Results
 todor66

Javelin throw
Javelin throw at the European Athletics Championships
1994 in women's athletics